Mikhail Vorobyev may refer to:

Mikhail Vorobyov (engineer) (1896–1957), Soviet military engineer
Mikhail Vorobyev (ice hockey) (born 1997), Russian ice hockey player